Ryan Hughes (born 1981) is a poker player who won a World Series of Poker bracelet at the 2007 World Series of Poker in the $2,000 Seven-Card Stud Hi-Low Split-8 or Better event and the 2008 World Series of Poker $1,500 Seven-Card Stud Hi-Low Split-8 or Better event. In February 2007, Hughes won the Professional Poker Tour event at the L.A. Poker Classic.

As of 2008, Ryan Hughes has tournament winnings of over $900,000. His nine cashes at the WSOP account for $461,319 of those winnings.

World Series of Poker bracelets

References

1981 births
American poker players
World Series of Poker bracelet winners
Sportspeople from Phoenix, Arizona
Living people